Jack Joseph Fitzwater (born 23 September 1997) is an English professional footballer who plays as a defender for Livingston.

Club career
Fitzwater is a product of the West Bromwich Albion academy and was named academy player of the year for the 2014–15 season.

On 11 September 2015, Fitzwater signed on loan for Chesterfield for one month. He made his Football League debut for Chesterfield on 12 September 2015, coming on as a 19th-minute substitute for Gboly Ariyibi against Colchester United at the Proact Stadium. This turned out to be his only appearance for the club and he returned to West Bromwich Albion on 9 October after his loan expired.

On 22 July 2017, Fitzwater signed for League Two club Forest Green Rovers on loan until January 2018.

On 31 January 2018, Fitzwater signed on loan for League One club Walsall.

Upon his return to West Bromwich Albion, Fitzwater signed a new two-year contract in June 2018.

He returned on loan to Walsall for a second spell in 2018, and was recalled by West Bromwich Albion on 3 January 2019. He returned for a third loan spell at Walsall on 31 January 2019.

After being released by West Brom, Fitzwater joined Scottish Premiership club Livingston on 8 July 2020.

Career statistics

References

External links

1997 births
Living people
English footballers
Association football defenders
West Bromwich Albion F.C. players
Chesterfield F.C. players
Forest Green Rovers F.C. players
Walsall F.C. players
English Football League players
National League (English football) players
Hednesford Town F.C. players
Livingston F.C. players
Scottish Professional Football League players